Tony Laus is a former association football player who represented New Zealand at international level.

Laus played three official full internationals for New Zealand, making his debut in a 4–1 win over Vanuatu on 27 June and scoring a hat-trick in his second match winning 8–0 against the same opposition on 1 July 1992. His final appearance in an official international was a 0–0 draw with Pacific neighbours Fiji on 9 September 1992.

References 

Year of birth missing (living people)
Living people
New Zealand association footballers
New Zealand international footballers
New Zealand people of Croatian descent
National Soccer League (Australia) players
Wollongong Wolves FC players
Association footballers not categorized by position